Alan Brian Carter (born 1952, Lincolnshire, England) is Emeritus Professor of Moral Philosophy at the University of Glasgow.

Life and work 
Carter earned a BA at the University of Kent at Canterbury, a MA at the University of Sussex and a DPhil at St Cross College at the University of Oxford.
Carter's first academic position was Lecturer in Political Theory at University College Dublin. He then became Head of the Philosophy Department at Heythrop College, University of London. Subsequently, he was Professor of Philosophy and Environmental Studies at the University of Colorado at Boulder.  He has been a Visiting Professor at the University of British Columbia and at the University of Bucharest. For a number of years Carter was joint editor of the Journal of Applied Philosophy.

He works principally in political philosophy, moral philosophy, and environmental philosophy. Carter has published on a wide range of topics: within political philosophy he has written on political obligation, equality, and property rights; within environmental philosophy he has written on the moral status of both nonhuman animals and ecosystems; within applied ethics he has written on problems regarding future persons and world hunger; within political theory he has written on theories of the state and Third World underdevelopment; and within anarchism and Marxism Carter has written on their respective theories of history. He is currently developing an environmentalist moral theory that is, normatively,  value pluralist and, metaethically, projectivist, topics he has previously written about in moral theory.

Some of Carter's work in environmental philosophy is discussed critically by Robin Attfield. Carter's state-primacy theory has been discussed by Robyn Eckersley and criticized by John Barry. and, most fully, by Simon Hailwood. Carter has responded by arguing that his critics fail to take sufficiently into account the problems the military causes in modern societies: "it is telling how little attention green liberal critics of the state-primacy theory have paid to the role of the military and to its highly distorting effects. Failing to examine in any detail military requirements within ostensibly 'liberal democracies', whether existing or imagined, is more like simply ignoring an argument rather than answering it."

Carter was one of the founder members of the London-based Anarchist Research Group. Colin Ward has described Carter, with Murray Bookchin, as one of the leading eco-anarchist thinkers.

Outside of academia, Carter is a former Chair of the World Development Movement Scotland and a former Board Member of Friends of the Earth Scotland. He is also a former Board Member and a former Trustee of Friends of the Earth.

Publications
Carter's publications include over 50 articles in academic journals and he is the author of 3 books:
 (1999)
 (1988)
 (1987)

Selected articles 
"A Solution to the Purported Non-Transitivity of Normative Evaluation," Journal of Philosophy 112, 1 (2015): 23-45
"A distinction within egalitarianism," Journal of Philosophy 108, 10 (2011): 535–54
"Anarchism: some theoretical foundations," Journal of Political Ideologies 16, 3 (2011): 245-264
"Beyond primacy: Marxism, anarchism and radical green political theory," Environmental Politics 19, 6 (2010): 951-972
"The problem of political compliance in Rawls's theories of justice: Parts I and II," The Journal of Moral Philosophy 3, 1 (2006): 7–21 and 3, 2 (2006): 135–157
"A defense of egalitarianism," Philosophical Studies 131, 2 (2006): 269–302
"Some Theoretical Foundations for Radical Green Politics," Environmental Values 13, 3 (2004): 305–28
"Saving nature and feeding people," Environmental Ethics 26, 4 (2004): 339–60
"Value-pluralist egalitarianism," Journal of Philosophy 99, 11 (2002): 577–99
"Can we harm future people?" Environmental Values 10, 4 (2001): 429–454
"Humean nature," Environmental Values 9, 1 (2000): 3–37
"Analytical anarchism: some conceptual foundations," Political Theory 28, 2 (2000): 230–53
"In defense of radical disobedience," The Journal of Applied Philosophy 15, 1 (1998): 29–47
"Towards a green political theory" in Andrew Dobson and Paul Lucardie (eds.), The Politics of Nature: Explorations in Green Political Theory (London: Routledge, 1993), pp. 39–62

Citations

External links
Alan Carter's webpage at Academia.edu

1952 births
Living people
21st-century British philosophers
Academics of Heythrop College
Academics of the University of Glasgow
Alumni of the University of Kent
Alumni of St Cross College, Oxford
Alumni of the University of Sussex
Anarchist theorists
English anarchists
English philosophers
English political philosophers
Environmental ethicists
Green anarchists
Green thinkers
Scholars of Marxism
Academic staff of the University of British Columbia
People educated at Monkwearmouth School